The 1999–00 UMass Minutemen basketball team represented the University of Massachusetts Amherst during the 1999–00 NCAA Division I men's basketball season. The Minutemen, led by fourth year head coach Bruiser Flint, played their home games at William D. Mullins Memorial Center and are members of the Atlantic 10 Conference. They finished the season 17-16, 9-7 in A-10 play to finish in third place.

Roster

Schedule

|-
!colspan=9| Exhibition

|-
!colspan=9| Regular Season

|-
!colspan=9| 2000 Atlantic 10 men's basketball tournament

|-
!colspan=9| 2000 NIT

References

UMass Minutemen basketball seasons
UMass
UMass